The Capitulary of Ver was issued by King Carloman in 884. It is often known as the last Carolingian capitulary. It deals with issues including Viking attacks, the creation of guilds, the relation between kings and bishops, and the maintenance of peace.

Further reading 
Edition: 'Karlomanni Capitulare Vernense', MGH Capitularia, https://www.dmgh.de/mgh_capit_2/index.htm#page/371/mode/1up

English translation: https://salutemmundo.wordpress.com/2018/09/26/source-translation-the-last-carolingian-capitulary/

References

Carolingian dynasty
Vikings
Frankish kings
9th century in Europe